Anupama Upadhyaya (born 12 February 2005) is an Indian badminton player. She is a former BWF World Junior Number 1. She became the Indian National Badminton Champion in women's singles in 2023.

Achievements

BWF International (2 titles, 2 runners-up) 
Women's singles

  BWF International Challenge tournament
  BWF International Series tournament
  BWF Future Series tournament

BWF Junior International (1 title) 
Girls' singles

  BWF Junior International Grand Prix tournament
  BWF Junior International Challenge tournament
  BWF Junior International Series tournament
  BWF Junior Future Series tournament

Performance timeline

National team 
 Junior level

Individual competitions 
 Junior level

 Senior level

References

External links 
 

Living people
2005 births
Indian female badminton players
Indian national badminton champions